Cold Steel is a 1921 American silent action film directed by Sherwood MacDonald and starring J.P. McGowan, Kathleen Clifford and Stanhope Wheatcroft.

Cast
 J.P. McGowan as 	Steele Weir
 Kathleen Clifford as 	Janet Hosmer
 Stanhope Wheatcroft as 	Ed Sorenson
 Arthur Millett as 	Mr. Sorenson
 Charles Inslee as 	Vose 
 Milton Brown as 	Burkhart 
 Nigel De Brulier as 	Martinez
 George Clair as 	Gordon
 Andrew Waldron as 	Johnson 
 Elinor Fair as 	Mary Johnson
 V.L. Barnes as 	Bartender
 William Steele as 	Sheriff

References

Bibliography
 Munden, Kenneth White. The American Film Institute Catalog of Motion Pictures Produced in the United States, Part 1. University of California Press, 1997.

External links
 

1920s American films
1921 films
1920s action films
1920s English-language films
American silent feature films
American action films
American black-and-white films
Films directed by Sherwood MacDonald
Film Booking Offices of America films
Silent action films